Bilavar (also as Bilavar is a village in Ivughli Rural District, Ivughli District, Khoy County, West Azerbaijan Province, Iran. At the 2022 census, its population was 2,000+ in 350+ families.

References 

Populated places in Khoy County